Y108 may refer to:

CJXY-FM, a Mainstream Rock radio station in Hamilton, Ontario, Canada
WDSY-FM, a Mainstream Country radio station in Pittsburgh, Pennsylvania, U.S.
KRXY-FM, a CHR radio station in Denver, Colorado, U.S. during the 1980s and early 1990s
 Yttrium-108 (Y-108 or 108Y), an isotope of yttrium